Leopold Island is an uninhabited island in the Qikiqtaaluk Region of Nunavut, Canada. It is located in the Labrador Sea, east of Cape Mercy at the tip of Baffin Island's Cumberland Peninsula.

References

Islands of Baffin Island
Uninhabited islands of Qikiqtaaluk Region
Islands of Frobisher Bay